The Subachoque River is a river on the Bogotá savanna and a right tributary of the Bogotá River.

Etymology 
Subachoque is derived from the indigenous language of the Muisca, who inhabited the Bogotá savanna before the Spanish conquest and means either "work of the Sun" of "farmfields of the front".

Description 

The Subachoque River originates in the easternmost part of Facatativá, Cundinamarca, west of Bogotá. It flows through the municipalities El Rosal, and Madrid before joining the Bojacá River in Mosquera and forming the Balsillas downstream part of the Bojacá River, flowing into the Bogotá River.

See also 

List of rivers of Colombia
Bogotá savanna

References

External links 
  Sistema Hídrico, Bogotá
  Hidrografía Río Bogotá

Rivers of Colombia
Bogotá River
Geography of Cundinamarca Department
Rivers
Subachoque